Gertrude Oforiwa Fefoame is a Ghanaian gender and disability rights advocate and the first person with a disability to have received the Excellence Grand Medal Award in 2007 from President John Kufuor.

Personal life 
She was born in 1957, at Akropong-Akuapem in the Eastern Region of Ghana and by age 10, she had started experiencing problems with her sight. She has three children with her husband.

Career life 
As at 2018, she had worked extensively for 28 years in both local and international front to better the lives of persons with disabilities. In 2018, she was appointed through election to the United Nations committee on the Convention on the Rights of Persons with Disabilities (CRPD).

References  

Ghanaian women activists
Ghanaian disability rights activists
Living people
Year of birth missing (living people)